St. Andrew was a  provincial electoral district in Ontario, Canada, that was established to elect Members of the Legislative Assembly (MLAs) and then Members of Provincial Parliament (MPPs) to the Legislative Assembly of Ontario.

It was located in downtown Toronto, and was made up of the area to the east of Bathurst Street and west of Yonge Street, including Spadina Avenue and Kensington Market. The population of St. Andrew was largely immigrant, working class and Jewish. For many years it was one of the few electoral districts in North America to elect a Communist. J.B. Salsberg of the Labor-Progressive Party represented the riding from the 1943 election until his defeat in the 1955 election.

The riding was created in 1926, and existed until the 1967, when redistribution resulted in St. Andrew being merged with a neighbouring riding to form St. Andrew—St. Patrick.

St. Andrew riding took its name from the former "St. Andrew's ward" of the City of Toronto.

Members of Provincial Parliament

Election results

1926 boundaries

1934 boundaries

References

Notes

Citations

Former provincial electoral districts of Ontario
Provincial electoral districts of Toronto